The Ifoto are an ethnic group living in Eastern Equatoria state, South Sudan. They speak a dialect of the Lotuko language.

References

Ethnic groups in South Sudan